John C. Coughenour (born 1941) is a senior United States district judge of the United States District Court for the Western District of Washington. Before being appointed as a judge, Coughenour was a leading litigator with Bogle and Gates and has taught trial and appellate practice at the University of Washington School of Law.

Education and career

Coughenour was born in Pittsburg, Kansas. He received a Bachelor of Science degree from Kansas State College of Pittsburg in 1963. He received a Juris Doctor from University of Iowa College of Law in 1966. Coughenour entered private practice in Seattle, Washington in 1966. He was an assistant professor of law at the University of Washington from 1970 to 1973.

Federal judicial service

Coughenour was nominated by President Ronald Reagan on August 11, 1981, to a seat on the United States District Court for the Western District of Washington vacated by Judge Morell Edward Sharp. He was confirmed by the United States Senate on September 25, 1981, and received commission on September 28, 1981. He served as Chief Judge from 1997 to 2004. He assumed senior status on July 27, 2006.

Coughenour testified before the Senate Judiciary Committee on 7 April 2004 and 4 June 2008.

Coughenour has opposed federal mandatory minimum sentences for a variety of crimes. He also frequently visited individuals in prison to better understand the system and effects of mandatory minimums.

Notable cases

Sexual Predator Law

In 1995 Coughenour found Washington State's Sexually Violent Predator Law to be "criminal in nature".
He ruled the law unconstitutionally violated protections against post facto laws and double jeopardy.

Amhed Ressam case

Coughenour was the judge who first sentenced Ahmed Ressam, the "millennium bomber", who planned to blow up the Los Angeles International Airport on New Year's Eve 1999.

Coughenour wrote an op-ed in The New York Times, entitled "How to Try a Terrorist", commenting on Michael B. Mukasey's nomination for Attorney General of the United States.
Coughenour compared his experience trying Ahmed Ressam with Michael B. Mukasey's trial of Omar Abdel Rahman for his role in the 1993 World Trade Center bombing.  He noted that Mukasey had complained about "the inadequacy of the current approach to terrorism prosecutions." 
He noted that Mukasey had complained about the limited number of terrorism convictions.
Coughenour paraphrased Mukasey: "Open prosecutions… potentially disclose to our enemies methods and sources of intelligence-gathering. Our Constitution does not adequately protect society from 'people who have cosmic goals that they are intent on achieving by cataclysmic means.'"  Coughenour wrote that his experience: "only strengthened my conviction that American courts, guided by the principles of our Constitution, are fully capable of trying suspected terrorists."

Reversal, and remand to different judge
On July 27, 2005, Coughenour sentenced Ressam to 22 years in prison, plus 5 years of supervision after his release.  On February 2, 2010, the U.S. Ninth Circuit Court of Appeals ruled that the 22-year sentence Coughenour had handed down was too lenient, and did not fit in the then-mandatory sentencing guidelines which indicated Ressam should have received at least 65 years, and up to 130 years, in prison. The court ordered that Ressam be re-sentenced by a different district court judge than Coughenour. An en banc panel of the Ninth Circuit subsequently reconsidered the 2010 opinion. The en banc panel agreed that the 22-year sentence was too lenient, but refused to remand the case to a different judge, instead sending the case back to Judge Coughenour. On remand, Judge Coughenour sentenced Ressam to 37 years imprisonment to be followed by 5 years of supervised release. The United States did not appeal the sentence.

Jason Scott Case

In 1995, Coughenour also presided over the civil trial of the Jason Scott case, which resulted in damages awarded against the Cult Awareness Network and deprogrammer Rick Ross.

References

External links
 Resumé
 

1941 births
Living people
People from Pittsburg, Kansas
Pittsburg State University alumni
University of Iowa alumni
University of Washington School of Law faculty
Lawyers from Seattle
Judges of the United States District Court for the Western District of Washington
United States district court judges appointed by Ronald Reagan
20th-century American judges
21st-century American judges